Myrtle Ethel Maclagan  (2 April 1911 – 11 March 1993) was an English cricketer who played as a right-handed batter and right-arm off break bowler. She appeared in 14 Test matches for England between 1934 and 1951. She played in the first-ever women's Test match, as well as captaining for England for two matches in 1951. She played domestic cricket for Surrey.

Cricket career
Maclagan attended the Royal School, Bath, where she was in the cricket team for six years, once taking five wickets in five balls in an inter-school match.

She played in the first women's Test match in 1934, and was one of the best-known women cricketers of her day, famous for making high scores against Australia. She scored the first Test century in women's cricket on 4 January 1935, when she made 119 for England against Australia at Sydney Cricket Ground. In that same Test, she also become the first woman to open the batting and bowling in the same Test match. The English men's team had lost the Ashes a few months earlier, and The Morning Post praised Maclagan's batting prowess with the quatrain:

What matter that we lost, mere nervy men
Since England's women now play England's game,
Wherefore Immortal Wisden, take your pen
And write MACLAGAN on the scroll of fame.

After the 1934–35 tour to Australia and New Zealand, Maclagan also played against Australia in England in 1937. After the war, she returned to cricket, touring Australia and New Zealand again in 1948–49 and then appearing against Australia in England in 1951.

Test centuries

Later life
Maclagan served as an officer in the Auxiliary Territorial Service during World War II. She rejoined the Army in 1951, serving as Inspector PT in the Women's Royal Army Corps. In 1966 she was awarded an MBE for Army services.

See also 
 List of centuries in women's Test cricket

References

Further reading

External links
 
 

1911 births
1993 deaths
People from Ambala
England women Test cricketers
Surrey women cricketers
Members of the Order of the British Empire
People educated at the Royal School for Daughters of Officers of the Army